Madhyanam Hathya (English : Afternoon Murder) is a 2004 Telugu language Indian crime thriller film directed by Ram Gopal Varma, with cinematography by Chota K. Naidu. The movie seems to closely follow the story of Horace William Manton, the main accused in the Luton Sack murder case. The soundtrack of the film was arranged by Shailendra Swapnil. The film was remade in Hindi as My Wife's Murder.

Plot 
A Police Inspector (Bhanuchander) is assigned to investigate the case of the dead woman whose body is recovered from a lake. The cop checks if this matter can be linked with a missing persons' report filed by a film editor Ravi Kumar (J. D. Chakravarthy) and his father-in-law. The dead woman is identified as Lakshmi (Aamani), Ravi's nagging and abusive wife, whom Ravi kills and packs the dead body in a carton box and dumps the box into a river in the city's outskirts.

According to Ravi, Lakshmi had left their home to go to visit her parents. When she had not arrived at their house 24 hours later, he himself had gone to their house, and on not being able to locate her, had accompanied his father-in-law to the nearest police station and filed a report as she is missing. The cop concludes that Lakshmi was waylaid on her way to her parents' house by person(s) unknown, beaten, and her body was left in the pond. But this case puzzles him, as there was no apparent motive for unknown person(s) to waylay her, as no money was taken, and her body does not shown any signs of sexual molestation. Taking these facts into consideration, The cop starts to suspect Ravi. Ravi's assistant (Priyanka Kothari) tries to help Ravi. However, her involvement makes the matter worse. The movie then takes the audience through thrilling tale of how Ravi makes out of this matter and truth behind Lakshmi's murder.

Cast 
 J. D. Chakravarthy as Ravi Kumar
 Aamani as Sri Lakshmi
 Priyanka Kothari as Nikita
 Venkat as Rohit, Nikita's boyfriend
 Bhanuchander as Police Inspector
 Raghunatha Reddy
 Narsing Yadav
 Brahmaji

Soundtrack

References

External links 

2004 films
2000s Telugu-language films
Indian crime thriller films
2004 crime thriller films
Telugu films remade in other languages